Kati Jo Spisak (born November 22, 1983) is retired American soccer player who played as a goalkeeper. She is currently an assistant coach for Washington Spirit in the NWSL.

Playing career

College
Spisak attended Texas A&M University where she was a three time All-American and team captain, and repeatedly on the Herman Trophy watch list. She would also earn team honors as Newcomer of the Year (2002) and Defensive MVP (2003).

Club

Washington Freedom
After college, Spisak began her professional career with Washington Freedom competing in USL W-League. She would step into starting goalkeeper after the retirement of Nicci Wright.

During the restructuring of the W-League into the new Women's Professional Soccer as the top flight women's league, the Washington Freedom officially drafted Spisak in Round 8.

Saint Louis and Boston
Ahead of the 2010 season, Spisak joined Saint Louis Athletica as a "developmental player," deputizing for Hope Solo. Athletica would fold mid-way during the season, releasing all rostered players as free agents.

After Athletica folded, Spisak joined Boston Breakers but made no appearances for the club.

International
Spisak was named to the United States U-21 team that competed and won the 2004 Nordic Cup.

Managing career

Washington Spirit
Ahead of the 2014 season, Spisak would return to Washington as an assistant coach for the Washington Spirit, supporting Mark Parson.

She also worked as head coach of the Washington Spirit Reserves and guided the team to their first W-League Title in 2015.

Honors

Manager

Washington Spirit Reserves
W-League: 2015

References

1983 births
Living people
American women's soccer players
Women's association football goalkeepers
Washington Freedom players
Saint Louis Athletica players
Boston Breakers players
United States women's under-20 international soccer players
Soccer players from Missouri
Texas A&M Aggies women's soccer players
Women's Professional Soccer players